Robert Ouko (24 October 1948 – 18 August 2019) was a Kenyan athlete, winner of gold medal in 4 × 400 m relay at the 1972 Summer Olympics.

Career 
Ouko won two golds at the 1970 British Commonwealth Games, first in 800 m and then as a member of the Kenyan 4 × 400 m relay team. At the same year he was also a member of a Kenyan 4x880 yd relay team, which set the new world record of 7:11.6.

At the Munich Olympics, Ouko was fifth in 800 m and ran the third leg in the gold medal-winning Kenyan 4 × 400 m relay team.

After his athletics career, Ouko worked as the secretary general in the Kenyan Amateur Athletic Association.

Ouko died 18 August 2019.

See also 
 Luo people of Kenya and Tanzania

References

External links
 

1948 births
2019 deaths
Kenyan male middle-distance runners
Kenyan male sprinters
Athletes (track and field) at the 1968 Summer Olympics
Athletes (track and field) at the 1970 British Commonwealth Games
Athletes (track and field) at the 1972 Summer Olympics
Olympic athletes of Kenya
Olympic gold medalists for Kenya
Commonwealth Games gold medallists for Kenya
Commonwealth Games medallists in athletics
Medalists at the 1972 Summer Olympics
Olympic gold medalists in athletics (track and field)
20th-century Kenyan people
Medallists at the 1970 British Commonwealth Games